Kretzschmar is a German surname. It comes from Middle High German kretschmar, which was borrowed from a Slavic language, e.g. Czech krčmář. Other forms include Kretschmar, Kretschmer, and Kreczmar (Polonized form).

Notable people with the surname include:

Hermann Kretzschmar (1848–1924), German musicologist and writer
Jörg Kretzschmar (born 1964), German footballer
Max Kretzschmar (born 1993), English footballer
Stefan Kretzschmar (born 1973), German handball player
Waltraud Kretzschmar (born 1948), East German handball player

References

German-language surnames
Surnames of Slavic origin
Occupational surnames